The 2014 Derby City Council election took place on 22 May 2014 to elect members of Derby City Council in England. This was on the same day as other local elections. The Labour Party remained in control of the council, with two gains and two losses resulting in no net change in its number of seats.

Election results

All comparisons in vote share are to the corresponding 2010 election.

Ward results

Abbey

Allestree

Alvaston

Arboretum

Blagreaves

Boulton

Chaddesden

Chellaston

Darley

Derwent

Littleover

Mackworth

Mickleover

Normanton

Oakwood

Sinfin

Spondon

References

2014 English local elections
2014
2010s in Derby